The siege of Dammaj started in October 2011 when the Houthis, a Zaydi-led rebel group which controls the Sa'dah Governorate, accused Salafis loyal to the Yemeni government of smuggling weapons into their religious center in the town of Dammaj and demanded they hand over their weapons and military posts in the town. As the Salafis refused, Houthi rebels responded by imposing a siege on Dammaj, closing the main entrances leading to the town. The town was controlled by the Houthis and the fighting was mainly centered at Dar al-Hadith religious school, which is run by Salafis, although its founder imam Muqbil bin Hadi al-Wadi'i rejected Osama bin Laden in the 1990s. The Salafis from Dammaj and its Dar al-Hadith imam Sheikh Yahya al-Hajuri claimed that they are totally against al-Qaeda and all that they stand for.

In December 2011, a tribal ceasefire was first signed in which both sides temporarily agreed to the removal of all their military checkpoints and barriers around Dammaj. Neutral armed men from the Hashid and Bakil tribes were deployed around the town to ensure both sides adhere to the ceasefire. However, fighting erupted again in October 2013 when Houthis shelled a Salafi mosque and the adjacent Quranic religious school, anticipating an attack from Salafi fighters who had gathered in Dammaj. Houthi rebels later advanced and took over many positions evacuated by outgunned Salafi fighters and subsequently blows up the symbolic Dar al-Hadith religious school after months of fighting.

The second ceasefire was brokered by the Yemeni government under president Abdrabbuh Mansur Hadi in January 2014. Yemeni troops have been deployed to the town of Dammaj and evacuated all Salafi fighters and their families as well as foreign students to the neighboring governorates, handing over victory to the Houthis.

Media and analysts have described the fighting in Dammaj as a sectarian conflict that may worsen Sunni-Shia relations in Yemen. Others believe that Dammaj represents part of regional contest between Saudi Arabia, who supported the Salafis traditionally, and Iran who backed the Houthi movement.

Background

Salafi establishment in Yemen
The roots of the sectarian conflict in Yemen can be arguably connected to Saudi Arabia's systematic proselytization of Salafism, a puritanical form of Islam, inside Yemen. Such effect of this proselytizing has somewhat caused resistance from Zaydi Shia demographics who perceives Wahhabism as a threat to their existence.

Sheikh Muqbil bin Hadi al-Wadi’i, a Yemeni student of the Islamic University of Medina in Saudi Arabia, founded the Dar al-Hadith institution at Dammaj in 1979, located in the heart of Sa'dah governorate which would later be the stronghold of the Houthi movement. Dammaj would later be turned into a pilgrimage site for thousands of students from across the world who sought to study Salafism in its purest form.

As the center targeted Zaydi adherents and converted them to Salafism, such Saudi and Yemeni governments policy has arguably led to a Zaydi revivalist movement at 1980s in response to rising Salafi hegemony which challenges the traditional Zaydi heartlands at northern regions of Yemen.

Houthi rise in Sa'dah

During the Houthi insurgency between 2004 to 2010, the Yemeni government led by president Ali Abdullah Saleh recruited over 5,000 Salafi fighters to fight alongside them. Houthis also alleged that the government was using al-Qaeda fighters as mercenaries to fight against them. At least 69 students from Dar al-Hadith were killed during Operation Scorched Earth while fighting on the government's side.

When the 2011 uprising against Ali Abdullah Saleh started, the Houthis joined the protests and took the opportunity to seize control of Sa'dah on March in response to "Karama Massacre" incident at capital Sana'a which prompted flood of army and government defections nationwide. The Houthis appointed former Saleh loyalist and arms dealer Fares Mana'a as their Sa'dah governor to manage military and security affairs for the governorate. The Salafi group in Dar al-Hadith however denounced the protests, siding with the government instead.

By July 2011, the Houthis have slowly expanded their battle towards neighbouring Al Jawf Governorate by clashing with tribal fighters loyal to the Sunni Islamist Al-Islah party, in which over 120 people were killed. The fighting erupted after pro-Islah tribes first took control of the governorate when its governor loyal to Ali Abdullah Saleh has fled, but Houthis refused to hand over a Yemeni military base which they had seized several months earlier. Fighting continued until 11 July with more than 30 people killed. The Houthis claimed that some elements of the pro-Islah militias had links to al-Qaeda.

In August, a car bomb has killed 14 Houthi rebels in Al Jawf during a meeting in a government administration complex at Al Matammah. Although the Houthis initially blamed the US and Israel for the bombing, Al Qaeda in the Arabian Peninsula eventually claimed responsibility, with the organization having declared a holy war against the Houthis earlier that year.

The siege

First phase
On 15 October 2011, the Houthis received a leaked letter from Dar al-Hadith's imam Sheikh Yahya al-Hajuri who urged the Central Security Organization commander Yahya Mohamed Abdullah Saleh to fight against the Houthis. At the same time, a 13-year-old Houthi supporter was also physically assaulted in Dammaj by Salafi students. This prompted the Houthis to demand that the Salafis empty their military posts in the city, claiming that the Dammaj school has made attacks against Houthi supporters and is attempting to take control of military positions outside of their area by continue to incite them, describing the Houthis as non-believers and carrying out military training for their supporters, but the Salafis refused. The Houthis responded by besieging Dar al-Hadith on 18 October, by surrounding it with snipers and attacking the Salafi-held Al Baraqa mountain on 30 October. The Salafis claimed the siege does not allow any food or medicine to enter the complex and have called upon Yemen authorities to break the siege. The Houthis claimed they are only blocking weapons from entering the area.

In response to the siege, tribesmen loyal to the Salafi group blocked the Al Buqa road connecting Sa'dah to Saudi Arabia and tribesmen from the Al Islah party blocked the Sana'a-Sa'dah road. Houthi-appointed Sa'dah governor Fares Mana'a tried to mediate a ceasefire in which the Houthis would re-open the road and both sides would withdraw to their old positions. The ceasefire however, lasted merely four hours, after which a new round of fighting broke out in which one Salafi fighter was killed. The school and surrounding areas, including 10,000 inhabitants were besieged for over two weeks.

Another ceasefire, crafted by local tribesmen which lasted one week, was broken on 25 November, when Houthis started shelling the Salafi fighters' positions in the town, killing three and wounding two. Houthi leader Saleh Habra said the Yemeni government was supplying arms to the Salafis and trying to help them set up a base near the Saudi border, stating the new attack was to cut off their arms supplies. Salafi leader Sheikh Yahya al-Hajuri responded by declaring jihad against the Houthis, which he described as "rejectionists".

The Houthis then launched a raid into the town in the pre-dawn hours on 26 November, which lasted until the afternoon of 27 November. According to a Houthi leader Dhaifullah al-Shami, the raid was in response to the Salafis rejecting a ceasefire offer by Houthi leader Abdul Malik al-Houthi and continued fighting. A total of 24 Salafis were killed and 61 injured during the raid. The deaths included two Indonesian and two American citizens. The two Indonesian's were later confirmed as Zamiri and Abu Soleh, both 24 years old. Al-Shami confirmed that several Houthis were also killed during the raid, which the Houthi spokesman Mohamed Abdelsalam put the number at less than ten. On 30 November, the Houthis shelled the town again, injuring 26 people.

On 3 December, the Houthis agreed to ease the blockade by allowing food aid supplied by the Red Cross to enter the area. However, they did not allow anyone to go in and out. Salafi students also accused the Houthis of confiscating a third of the food for themselves, a claim denied by the Houthis. According to the Red Cross four children had died of hunger and three elderly men of lack of medications, between 3 December and the start of the siege. The town was still said to be short on fuel. Houthis claimed a ceasefire had been put in place, however fighting reportedly continued on both sides

On 7 December, 3 Houthis were killed after Salafis launched a new attack. Houthi leader Abdul Malik al-Houthi responded in a statement saying that "In a step that reveals their malicious intentions, they opened fire on us, killing three people, these unprovoked attacks are unjustified and are aimed at igniting a sectarian war in the country." The Houthis responded by shelling Salafi positions on the Al Baraqa mountain, killing six people and injuring 15. A Salafi spokesman claimed that "al-Houthis have taken advantage of the ceasefire and made advances on Al Baraqa mountain" and said that he expected casualties to rise as violence would continue On 7 December, new clashes broke out in which three Houthis and four Salafis were killed. According to eyewitnesses, the Houthis generally had the upper hand during the fighting, although Salafis managed to capture several Houthi positions. Houthis barricaded their positions on Al Baraqa.

Sectarian clashes broke out on 8 December at the main highway in Kitaf where the Houthis had been blockading for weeks. According to government officials, the Houthis attacked a convoy sent by the Sunni Wa'ela tribe to bring food and medicine to Dammaj. The Houthis however, claimed that the aid caravan en-route to Dammaj was a military caravan and attacked Houthi followers in Kitaf area. The Houthis called the convoy a provocation through which foreign forces were trying to ignite sectarian violence in the region. Eight Houthis and six tribesmen were killed and fifteen people were injured in the fighting.

On 19 December, Houthis shelled Dammaj, killing five Sunnis including a child. The next day, fighters from the Sunni Wa'ela tribe attacked the western side of Dammaj in an attempt to bring aid into the town. Five Wa'ela tribal fighters and four Houthis were killed during the clashes.

Ceasefire
On 22 December, a tribal ceasefire was signed in which both sides agreed to the removal of all their military checkpoints and barriers around the town. Neutral armed men from the Hashid and Bakil tribes were deployed around the town to ensure both sides adhere to the ceasefire. Despite this, the truce did not last long. Clashes between Houthi rebels and Salafi fighters erupted again on 12 January 2012 which takes place at Sa'dah outskirts and Mustaba in Hajjah Governorate.

In June 2012, renewed clashes between Houthi tribesmen and Salafi students left 22 dead from the latter, including 2 British citizens.

Renewed clashes
On 29 October 2013, fighting started again when Houthi forces shelled a Salafi mosque and the adjacent Quranic religious school, prompting an attack from 4,000 Salafi fighters who had gathered in Dammaj. 58 were killed and a hundred wounded in the Salafi side, with no reports of casualties on the Houthi side. In 21 December, the Houthi-Salafi conflict has soon spilled over to Amran Governorate, leaving several fighters from both sides dead and wounded. This came amidst pro-Islah and Salafi armed tribesmen tried to open different fronts in Amran and Al Jawf Governorates, as well as tribesmen in Arhab, north of Sana’a, blocked the roads leading to Sa'dah preventing the entrance of goods and services toward Houthi groups into Sa'dah.

Houthi rebels and Salafi fighters continue at many northern governorates on early January 2014. By this time, the sectarian conflict has been reported in Sa'dah, Amran, Al Jawf, and Hajjah. However, the Houthis soon managed to advance towards Salafi positions, the latter who were slowly outgunned due to Houthi siege, in Kitaf and Al Buqa. Consequently, the rebels blow up the Dar al-Hadith religious school and 20 houses, symbolically destroying Salafi hegemony in Dammaj.

Government mediation
The Yemeni government did not officially participate in the battles between Houthi rebels and Salafi fighters since 2011. Instead, it has been working to send government representatives in attempt to mediate for a prolonged ceasefire in Dammaj since December 2013.

On early January 2014, a team of presidential delegation under Abdrabbuh Mansur Hadi and committee headed by Sana'a mayor Abdulqader Hilal arrived at Sa'dah to reach for peace deal between fighters from both sides. Only by 12 January, a ceasefire agreement was finally signed between Houthi rebels and Sunni tribesmen which ended the conflict in Dammaj and most of northern governorates.

As part of the ceasefire, Yemeni troops deployed to the town of Dammaj and evacuated all Salafi fighters and their families to the neighboring Al Hudaydah Governorate and Sana'a Governorate, thus handing over victory to the Houthis. Many Salafis however said they felt "cheated" over the agreement.

Aftermath
By January 2014, the sectarian conflict in Dammaj has left over 830 people killed, most of them from Salafi side. The Houthis did not release their own reports of casualties.

Reactions
Following the siege, the government of Indonesia tried to evacuate its citizens from the Dar al-Hadith institute where over 100 Indonesians were said to live. Yemen's Indonesian ambassador, Agus Budiman, said it was difficult for them to evacuate the students because most of them did not want to leave and were armed and "ready for jihad", adding that the government was "worried about their condition". They were eventually contacted with permission of Sheikh al-Hajoori and the Houthis said they would ensure the safety of their evacuation, although they did not allow embassy staff to enter the compound or take the bodies.

Yemeni Salafi Islamists held a rally Sana'a on 30 November, led by Mohammad al-Ammari, to protest the siege. Ammari said that thousands of people were being besieged and deprived of food and medicines, accusing the Houthis of trying to create a Shi'a state in North Yemen. Salafi clerics at the rally warned the Houthis that they would be willing to deploy fighters to Dammaj.

The Yemeni National Council (an opposition council established on 17 August 2011 to lead the revolution against Saleh) send a delegation led by Mussed Al-Radaee, general secretary of the Nasserite Party to Sa'dah. A similar delegation was sent by protesters from Sanaa's Change Square. Neither group has released their report yet.

On 3 December, in a message was posted on jihadist website Shumukh al-Islam, al-Qaeda in the Arabian Peninsula leader Nasir al-Wuhayshi announced they would be deploying fighters to Dammaj to combat the Houthis. Another Yemeni al-Qaeda leader, sheikh Abu Zubair Adil al-Abab released a statement during a lecture in which he stated al-Qaeda would be providing training to Sunni fighters in Dammaj and warned the Houthis that "You tried our strength, and the day of al-Ghadir is not far from you." Nasir al-Wuhayshi is himself an alumnus of one of Dar al-Hadith's offshoots and according to Said Obaid, chairman of the Al-Jemhi Centre for Researches and Studies, "graduates of these schools are almost ready to be Al-Qaeda members." On 12 December, an audio message was posted on jihadist websites by al-Qaeda leader Ibrahim al-Rubaish, which declared jihad against Houthi rebels.

See also
 List of modern conflicts in the Middle East

References

Military operations involving Yemen
Conflicts in 2011
2011 in Yemen
Houthi insurgency in Yemen
Yemeni Crisis (2011–present)
Saada Governorate
Battles in 2011